Lepidochrysops arabicus, the Arabian giant Cupid, is a butterfly in the family Lycaenidae. It is found in Yemen. The habitat consists of rocky meadows at altitudes ranging from 1,500 to 2,800 meters.

The length of the forewings is about 16 mm. The upperside of both wings is shining lavender blue. The costa and outer margin are outlined in blackish brown.  There is a blackish-brown transverse line at the end of the cell on the forewings.  The hindwings are tailed. The underside of both wings is greyish brown, the forewings with two transverse white lines enclosing a brown spot.  There are five brownish-black basal spots on the hindwings and an irregular discal row of six spots enclosed in white rings. Adults are on wing from September to October.

The larvae possibly feed on Nepeta deflersiana.

References

Butterflies described in 1954
Lepidochrysops
Endemic fauna of Yemen